The 2017 season was the Jacksonville Jaguars' 23rd in the National Football League (NFL) and their first under head coach Doug Marrone. Marrone was hired after acting as the team's interim head coach for the final two games of the 2016 season. The team improved on their 3–13 record from 2016 and ended their 10-year playoff drought dating back to 2008 with a week 15 win over the Houston Texans. They also secured their first winning season since 2007 after a 30–24 win over the Seattle Seahawks. On December 24, 2017, they clinched their third division title, and their first AFC South title following a Tennessee Titans loss. They won the wild card game against the Buffalo Bills 10–3, then headed to Pittsburgh, beating the Pittsburgh Steelers 45–42 to advance to the AFC Championship to face the New England Patriots, the first time that they had made the AFC Championship Game since 1999. Despite leading for much of the game, the Jaguars would allow two 4th quarter touchdowns, and ultimately lost to the Patriots 24–20.

One of the biggest catalysts for the Jaguars success during the 2017 season was their defense. Jacksonville finished in the top of the league in multiple defensive categories, and were considered "historically good" by some analysts. The Jaguars defense led the league in forced fumbles (17), completion percentage (56.8), passing yards allowed per game (169.9), passer rating (68.5) and defensive touchdowns (7). They also finished second in sacks (55), interceptions (21), total takeaways (33), yards allowed per game (286.1) and points allowed per game (16.8). Along with their spectacular defense, the Jaguars were also the top rushing offense in the NFL, averaging 141 rush yards per game.

The Jaguars would neither make the playoffs nor win the division again until 2022.

Unrestricted free agents

Acquisitions

Draft

Notes
 The Jaguars traded TE Julius Thomas to Miami for its seventh-round selection (240th). 
 The Jaguars traded their second- and sixth-round selections (35th and 187th) to Seattle for its second-round selection (34th).

Staff

Final roster

Preseason

Regular season

Schedule
On December 13, 2016, the NFL announced that the Jaguars would play host to the Baltimore Ravens at Wembley Stadium in London, England, as part of their commitment to the London Games. The game occurred during Week 3 (Sunday, September 24), and was televised in the United States. The kickoff was announced in conjunction with the release of the regular season schedule.

The remainder of the Jaguars' 2017 schedule was finalized and announced on April 20.

Note: Intra-division opponents are in bold text.

Game summaries

Week 1: at Houston Texans

Week 2: vs. Tennessee Titans

Week 3: vs. Baltimore Ravens
NFL London Games

Week 4: at New York Jets

Week 5: at Pittsburgh Steelers

Week 6: vs. Los Angeles Rams

Week 7: at Indianapolis Colts

Week 9: vs. Cincinnati Bengals

Week 10: vs. Los Angeles Chargers

Week 11: at Cleveland Browns

Week 12: at Arizona Cardinals

Week 13: vs. Indianapolis Colts

Week 14: vs. Seattle Seahawks

Week 15: vs. Houston Texans

Week 16: at San Francisco 49ers

Week 17: at Tennessee Titans

Standings

Division

Conference

Postseason

AFC Wild Card Playoffs: vs. (6) Buffalo Bills

AFC Divisional Playoffs: at (2) Pittsburgh Steelers

AFC Championship: at (1) New England Patriots

References

External links
 

Jacksonville
Jacksonville Jaguars seasons
Jacksonville Jaguars
AFC South championship seasons